Kunststiftung NRW (Art Foundation NRW) is a foundation created by the government of the German state North Rhine-Westphalia. It was established on September 12, 1989, and started operations in the spring of 1990. It is based in Düsseldorf, Germany.

The functions of the foundation are:
 Promotion and cooperation in extraordinary projects of presentation and documentation of art and culture in North Rhine-Westphalia;
 Promotion and acquisition of art objects of extraordinary significance for North Rhine-Westphalia;
 Encouragement of talented young artists; and
 Promotion of international cultural exchange.

External links
 Official website

German art
Arts foundations based in Europe
Arts organisations based in Germany
Culture of North Rhine-Westphalia
Organisations based in Düsseldorf